Nahid is an Iranian newspaper  in Fars region. The Concessionaire of this magazine was Mirza Ebrahim Nahid and it was published in Shiraz since 1909.

See also
List of magazines and newspapers of Fars

References

Newspapers published in Fars Province
Mass media in Fars Province
Newspapers published in Iran
Newspapers published in Qajar Iran
Newspapers established in 1909